The Donskoy ryley is a stringed musical instrument from Russia. It is a type of hurdy-gurdy, where the strings are constantly bowed by a wheel which is turned using a crank, and the pitch of the strings changed by keys attached to sliding tangents.

Hurdy-gurdies
Russian musical instruments